Terje Joelsen (born 3 June 1968) is a retired Norwegian football striker.

He played youth football for Ullensaker/Kisa IL, and also featured for the senior team. Ahead of the 1990 season he joined Vålerengens IF. After some years in the Norwegian Premier League, ahead of the 1996 season he joined Holter IF in the Second Division.

References

1968 births
Living people
Norwegian footballers
Ullensaker/Kisa IL players
Vålerenga Fotball players
People from Akershus
Association football forwards
Sportspeople from Viken (county)